In Concert is a live album by The Dubliners, released in 1965.

By the time The Dubliners had recorded their second album live at the Cecil Sharp House in December 1964, they had become a quintet. Luke Kelly had temporarily left the group and Bobby Lynch and John Sheahan had joined. This was to be Lynch's only recording with The Dubliners, as he left the group when Kelly returned. Sheahan has been with the group ever since and in latter years has become their manager.

Track listing

Side one
 Roddy McCorley - 3:47
 The Twang Man - 2:12
 Reels: The Sligo Maid & Colonel Rodney - 2:13
 The Woman from Wexford - 2:42
 The Patriot Game - 4:23
 Roisin Dubh - 4:06
 Air fa la la lo - 3:44

Side two
 Peggy Lettermore - 1:49
 Easy and Slow - 2:59
 Reel: My Love is in America - 2:07
 The Kerry Recruit - 4:16
 The Old Orange Flute - 2:58
 Reels: The Donegal Reel & The Longford Collector" - 2:10
 Leaving of Liverpool - 4:58

Personnel
Barney McKenna - tenor banjo, mandolin, vocals
John Sheahan - fiddle, mandolin, tin whistle
Ciarán Bourke - tin whistle, guitar, harmonica, vocals
Bobby Lynch - guitar, vocals
Ronnie Drew - guitar, vocals

References

The Dubliners live albums
1965 live albums
Transatlantic Records live albums